Capones Island Lighthouse is a historic lighthouse located in Capones Island off the coast of Barangay Pundaquit, San Antonio, in the province of Zambales, in the Philippines. The light guides international vessels coming from the north to northwest towards Subic Bay or to Corregidor Island Lighthouse at the entrance of Manila Bay.  It had first-order lenses when it was first lit on August 1, 1890.

The island is famous for the century-old Capones Lighthouse. Most visitors would leave Manila very early in the morning and would go straight to an island hopping tour of Capones Island and the nearby coves.

Current condition 

The original lamp and lantern were replaced with a modern solar-powered lighthouse light as part of the Maritime Safety Improvement of the Philippine Coast Guard. Only the tower was renovated. The keeper's house and the other buildings in the station were left deteriorating.

See also 

 List of lighthouses in the Philippines

References

External links 
 
 
 Maritime Safety Services Command
 Capones Light Station on Light Stations of the National Capital Region and Central Luzon at the  Philippine Coast Guard Website.

Lighthouses completed in 1890
Lighthouses in the Philippines
Spanish colonial infrastructure in the Philippines
Buildings and structures in Zambales
Tourist attractions in Zambales
1890 establishments in the Philippines